Dinosaurs: The Final Day with David Attenborough (titled Dinosaur Apocalypse in the U.S.) is a British documentary programme that aired on BBC One on 15 April 2022. Presented by David Attenborough, the documentary follows the final days of non-avian dinosaurs through the Cretaceous–Paleogene extinction event, similar to BBC's Prehistoric Planet. Like that series, the programme's creatures were also made with computer-generated imagery.

In the United States, the documentary aired in a two-episode format for the PBS series NOVA - under the title Dinosaur Apocalypse - on 11 May 2022.

Synopsis 
Using the Tanis fossil site in the Hell Creek Formation as evidence, Attenborough and other palaeontologists try to piece together the extinction of the dinosaurs and the asteroid believed to have killed them, 65 million years ago.  At this site in North Dakota, numerous groundbreaking fossil discoveries that reveal information on the final years of the Cretaceous period and the organisms that were alive during the period have been made.

On a spring morning, 65 million years ago, Tanis was a sandbank on the edge of a river near the Western Interior Seaway. Pterosaurs congregate in huge numbers to nest and raise their young, a mother Tyrannosaurus rex tends to her eggs, and two Triceratops spar over territory in the woods just beyond the water's edge. Meanwhile, the river itself is full of a host of aquatic and semi-aquatic organisms, including Baenid turtles, sturgeons, paddlefish and bowfins, plus Thescelosaurus, which uses the water as an advantage to escape bigger predators. Early marsupial mammals also thrive at Tanis, though they spend much of their time burrowing through the ground and scurrying through the undergrowth to avoid the other animals that make the sandbank their home. 

Immediately after the Chicxulub asteroid struck the Yucatan Peninsula, life continued at Tanis as normal for several minutes. The titanic blast generated by the impact would have been visible, but silent, as its shock wave dissipated a long distance away from Tanis. A combination of seismic waves, a rain of red hot tektite spherules and a ten-metre high seiche wave sent up the Interior Seaway - all directly resulting from the asteroid impact - swiftly wipe out the area's ecosystem, preserving many different species beneath a layer of sediment that would eventually be unearthed by researchers as fossils in the present day. Two such fossils are discovered that give particular insight into Tanis's fate; a Thescelosaurus fossil is found with its skeleton in a jumbled state, suggesting it was killed by being thrown about by turbulent water, while a fossil of a turtle shows signs of the animal being impaled by airborne or waterborne debris. Meanwhile, Tree resin contains one of the many millions of tektite spherules that rained down from the sky, preserving it in the present day as an inclusion in a piece of amber, while the impactor leaves additional evidence of its extraterrestrial origin in the form of a layer of iridium - an element rare in Earth’s crust, but common in asteroids - across the globe, in the form of the Cretaceous–Paleogene boundary.

In the hours that follow, the Earth's atmosphere heats up to the point that only the hardiest animals can survive the relentless flames and smoke that enshroud the planet, giving rise to a nuclear winter. As the Paleogene commences, mammals, reptiles - including lizards, snakes, turtles and crocodiles and their relatives, among others - and birds inherit the planet, beginning the age of mammals that persists to the present day. In the case of the birds, they persist as a surviving lineage of the theropod dinosaurs; thus, it is more correct to say that the Cretaceous extinction event brought about an end to all Non-avian dinosaurs, but not dinosaurs as a whole.

Reception 
Chitra Ramaswamy of The Guardian rated the documentary four out of five stars.

References

External  Links
 

Documentary television series about dinosaurs
David Attenborough
BBC television documentaries
English-language television shows
Documentary films about extinctions